Hemakumara Wickramathilaka Nanayakkara is a Sri Lankan politician and was the 7th Governor of the Western Province of Sri Lanka, in office since 12 April 2018. He has also been a Governor of the Southern Province, a former member of the Parliament of Sri Lanka and a former government minister. Nanayakkara played active roles for the United National Party victory at the 2001 General election. He was appointed as minister soon after the election. Later in 2007 he decided to support the UPFA. In 2012 Nanayakkara quit from the UPFA to form his own party called Ruhunu Janatha Party. The Party joined United National Party at the 2015 Presidential election to support the common candidate. Soon after the 2015 election victory he was appointed the Governor of Southern Province.

See also
 List of political families in Sri Lanka

References

Year of birth missing (living people)
Living people
Members of the 9th Parliament of Sri Lanka
Members of the 11th Parliament of Sri Lanka
Members of the 12th Parliament of Sri Lanka
Members of the 13th Parliament of Sri Lanka
Government ministers of Sri Lanka
Sri Lanka Freedom Party politicians
United National Party politicians
United People's Freedom Alliance politicians
Alumni of Richmond College, Galle